The 2021 Engie Open Saint-Gaudens Occitanie was a professional women's tennis tournament played on outdoor clay courts. It was the twenty-fourth edition of the tournament which was part of the 2021 ITF Women's World Tennis Tour. It took place in Saint-Gaudens, France between 10 and 16 May 2021.

Singles main-draw entrants

Seeds

 1 Rankings are as of 26 April 2021.

Other entrants
The following players received wildcards into the singles main draw:
  Océane Babel
  Aubane Droguet
  María Gutiérrez Carrasco
  Séléna Janicijevic

The following player received entry using a protected ranking:
  Alexandra Dulgheru

The following player received entry as a junior exempt:
  Elsa Jacquemot

The following players received entry from the qualifying draw:
  Tessah Andrianjafitrimo
  Loïs Boisson
  Anna Bondár
  Katharina Gerlach
  Tayisiya Morderger
  Diane Parry
  Alice Ramé
  Margot Yerolymos

The following player received entry as a lucky loser:
  Kimberley Zimmermann

Champions

Singles

 Clara Burel def.  Alexandra Dulgheru, 6–2, 1–6, 6–2

Doubles

 Estelle Cascino /  Jessika Ponchet def.  Eden Silva /  Kimberley Zimmermann, 0–6, 7–5, [10–7]

References

External links
 2021 Engie Open Saint-Gaudens Occitanie at ITFtennis.com
 Official website

2021 ITF Women's World Tennis Tour
2021 in French tennis
May 2021 sports events in France
Open Saint-Gaudens Occitanie